Michael Aničić (born 18 October 1974) is a German former professional footballer who played as a midfielder.

References

1974 births
Living people
German footballers
German people of Serbian descent
Association football midfielders
Eintracht Frankfurt players
Eintracht Frankfurt II players
Grazer AK players
SV Ried players
SC Freiburg players
SV Darmstadt 98 players
Hapoel Haifa F.C. players
FC Carl Zeiss Jena players
SV Waldhof Mannheim players
FSV Frankfurt players
Bundesliga players
2. Bundesliga players
German expatriate footballers
German expatriate sportspeople in Austria
Expatriate footballers in Austria
German expatriate sportspeople in Israel
Expatriate footballers in Israel
Footballers from Frankfurt